The 2015 Anzac Test was a rugby league test match played between Australia and New Zealand at Suncorp Stadium in Brisbane. It was the 16th Anzac Test played between the two nations since the first was played under the Super League banner in 1997. Both sides were announced on 26 April. The game was originally scheduled to take place on 1 May, but it was postponed due to bad weather. The Test instead took place on May 3, along with a Women's rugby league match between the Australian Jillaroos and New Zealand Kiwi Ferns which served as the curtain-raiser for the main game, won 22-14 by the Jillaroos.

New Zealand's win was their first Anzac Test win in 17 years, and the first time New Zealand had won three consecutive test matches over Australia since 1953.

As man of the match, Manu Vatuvei was awarded the Charles Savory medal.

Pre-game

National anthems
 Russ Walker - New Zealand National Anthem
 Adrian Li Donni - Australian National Anthem

Squads

1 - Shifted to Fullback taking the place of originally selected Billy Slater who withdrew due to injury. Michael Jennings was promoted from originally 19th Man to Centre.
2 - Replaced originally selected Dallin Watene-Zelezniak who was withdrawn due to suspension.
Daly Cherry-Evans and Josh Papalii were a part of the Kangaroos squad but did not play in the match.
Lewis Brown and Kodi Nikorima were a part of the Kiwis squad but did not play in the match.

Match summary

Women's Test

A Women's rugby league match between the Australian Jillaroos and New Zealand Kiwi Ferns which served as the curtain-raiser for the main game, won 22-14 by the Jillaroos.

Women's squads

Match summary

See also

References

External links

2015 in Australian rugby league
2015 in New Zealand rugby league
Anzac Test
Rugby league in Brisbane
International rugby league competitions hosted by Australia